Buty is a Czech music group originally from Ostrava, formed in 1986 by Richard Kroczek and Radek Pastrňák from the bands U238 and B komplex. The founding members were joined by Vít Kučaj, Ivan Myslikovjan, and Luděk Piásečný. The name of the group means "shoes" in the local dialect.

Background and history
The group's musical style is eclectic, mixing rock and folk with other styles, including world music, country, jazz, reggae, and others. The group became popular in Czechoslovakia at the beginning of the 1990s, and their popularity peaked at the end of that decade, when their concerts attracted audiences of thousands and they were among the most popular bands in the country. Buty recorded music for Jízda, a 1994 road movie by Jan Svěrák, which also features the band leader Radek Pastrňák in one of the main roles; the band's album PPoommaalluu is partially a soundtrack for the movie.

Band members
Current
 Radomír Pastrňák – lead guitar, vocals
 Richard Kroczek – drums
 Petr Vavřík – bass guitar
 Milan Straka – wind instruments
 Vlastimil Šmída – keyboards

Past
 Milan Nytra – keyboards
 Alan Švejk Hudeček – vocals
 Marek Moroň – vocals
 Ivan Myslikovjan
 Luděk Piásečný
 Vít Kučaj
 Andrei Toader
 David Straka

Discography
Studio albums
 Pískej si, pískej (1992)
 Ppoommaalluu (1994)
 Dřevo (1995)
 Rastakayakwanna (1997)
 Kapradí (1999)
 Normale (2001)
 Votom (2006)
 Duperele (2012)

Compilations
 buTYKVAriát (2003)

Live albums
 Kosmostour 2000 (Live) (2000)

Soundtracks
 Jízda (Motion picture soundtrack – 1994)
 Tajnosti (Motion picture soundtrack – 2007)
 Mamas & Papas (Motion picture soundtrack – 2010)

Singles
 "Malinkého ptáčka" (1996)
 "Tata" (1999)

Selected awards and nominations
 1994 Czech Lion Awards for Jan Svěrák's Jízda
 1995 Anděl Award for Best Band
 1997 Anděl Award for Best Band
 1999 Anděl Award for Best Band
 Nominated for 2007 Czech Lion Awards for Alice Nellis's Tajnosti.
 Nominated for 2010 Czech Lion Awards for Alice Nellis's Mamas & Papas

References

External links

 

Musical groups established in 1986
Czech rock music groups
1986 establishments in Czechoslovakia